Wang Jiyuan was a Chinese artist. He co-founded the Juelan Society along with Ni Yide, Pang Xunqin, Chen Cheng-po, and others. Juelan members promoted innovation in the Chinese arts under the motto “fierce passion, firm rationality”

Biography
Wang Jiyuan (literary name was the “Owner of Liao Dong Ge”) was born and raised in Wujin, Jiangsu. He studied at Jiangsu Second Normal School before entering the Shanghai College of Art (later changed to Shanghai Fine Arts School) in 1913. A year after graduating, he worked at his alma mater and eventually became director of the Western Painting Division at the Shanghai Fine Arts School.

Wang Jiyuan was good at composing watercolor works in both the Western and Chinese style, with an emphasis on plein air. He was active in the Shanghai art circles in his early years, but also traveled to Europe and Japan to study. He was very enthusiastic about the Western painting movement in modern China throughout his career.

In 1918, along with fellow art teachers Liu Haisu and Wang Yachen, Mr. Wang co-founded the Tian-Ma Society to advocate the ideas of modern art. In 1928, he founded another organization, the Yiyuan Painting Institute (simplified as Yiyuan). Members of this institution included experienced students who had studied abroad, such as Zhu Qizhan, Pan Yuliang, and Chen Cheng-po, and provided these young artists with opportunities to further their art studies. In 1932, Wang co-founded the Juelan Society along with Ni Yide, Pang Xunqin, Chen Cheng-po, and others. Juelan members promoted innovation in the Chinese arts under the motto “fierce passion, firm rationality”.

In addition to his creative activities, Wang taught Chinese painting, and also contributed to middle school art textbooks, including Watercolor Painting and Fundamentals of Western Painting Technique (this book was written in collaboration with Ni Yide).

In 1941, Wang Jiyuan settled in the United States, though he later returned to Taiwan as an overseas Chinese and hosted an exhibition there. Later in life, Wang donated his works to notable collections, such as Taiwan's National Palace Museum and the National Museum of History. In January 1964, Wang Jiyuan died of illness in New York. Four years later, his family members brought the ashes of Mr. and Mrs. Wang back to Taiwan. A sea burial ceremony was held by the military, and their ashes were scattered in the ocean off the shores of Keelung.

References

Republic of China painters
1893 births
1975 deaths
Painters from Changzhou
People from Wujin District
Chinese emigrants to the United States